Kids Say the Darndest Things is an American comedy series originally hosted by Bill Cosby that aired on CBS from January 9, 1998, to June 23, 2000. A revival hosted by Tiffany Haddish aired on ABC from October 6, 2019, to January 19, 2020. ABC cancelled the revival after one season. However, the revival moved to CBS, its original network, from May 5 to June 23, 2021, with Haddish returning as host.

Premise
The host would begin a conversation by posing a question about life topics to a child, who usually responds with their own innocent, often comedic perspectives on the various topics.

In the show's first inception, it would sometimes flash back to the 1950s and 1960s show Art Linkletter's House Party, with Cosby joined onstage by Art Linkletter, that show's host, to introduce the vintage clips. It would show kids (of the time), their same comedic reactions to whatever Linkletter would ask or say to them. Cosby also provided some of the humor in the show.

The revival continued the premise, with part of the show performed in front of a live audience, and the rest featuring taped segments.

Production
For the series' first iteration, Kids Say the Darndest Things was produced by CBS Productions with the co-production of LMNO Productions and Linkletter's company, Linkletter Productions.

The revival continued its CBS association via CBS Studios, and was also co-produced by Haddish through her production company, She Ready Productions, and Eric Schotz of Anvil 1893 Entertainment.

Conception
The show is based on a feature with the same name in Art Linkletter's radio show House Party and television series, Art Linkletter's House Party, which together aired mostly five days a week from 1945 to 1969.

In other media
The subplot of the Family Guy episode "Brian Does Hollywood" features Stewie auditioning for the show in an attempt to hypnotize the entire world using a mind-control device, with Cosby later unwittingly foiling his plans.

In 2005, Robert Johnson and Albert Evans adapted the show into a full-length musical comedy.

International versions

References

External links

1990s American comedy television series
1998 American television series debuts
2000 American television series endings
2000s American comedy television series
2010s American comedy television series
2019 American television series debuts
2020s American comedy television series
2021 American television series endings
American Broadcasting Company original programming
American television series revived after cancellation
Bill Cosby
CBS original programming
English-language television shows
Television series by CBS Studios
Television series about children